Sandro Sukno (born 30 June 1990) is a Croatian former professional water polo player. At the 2012 Summer Olympics, he competed for the Croatia national team in the men's event winning the gold medal.  He also won a silver medal at the 2016 Summer Olympics. He last played for VK Jug. He currently works as an assistant coach of the senior men's Croatia national team. 

Sandro's father is Goran Sukno, water polo gold medalist for Yugoslavia at the 1984 Summer Olympics.

Sandro was named Croatian water polo player of the year in 2014 and 2015, and best player in the 2014–15 Prva Liga. In December 2017, Sukno won the trophy for the best water polo player in the 2016–17 season. In 2017 he was named to the All-Star Team of the World Championships.  Croatia also won the World Championship that year. In May 2019, he announced his retirement from playing professional water polo citing heart problems.

Honours

As Player
Pro Recco
LEN Champions League: 2011–12
LEN Super Cup: 2012, 2015
Adriatic League: 2011 –12
Serie A1: 2011–12, 2015–16, 2016–17
Coppa Italia: 2015–16, 2016–17
Primorje Rijeka
 LEN Champions League runners-up:  2014–15 
Croatian Championship: 2013–14, 2014–15
Croatian Cup: 2012–13, 2013–14, 2014–15 
 Adriatic League: 2012–13, 2013–14, 2014–15

As Coach
Pro Recco
LEN Champions League: 2021–22
LEN Super Cup: 2021, 2022
Coppa Italia: 2021–22

Awards
Total-waterpolo magazine's man water polo "World Player of the Year" award: 2017
Member of the Second World Team of the Year's 2000–20 by total-waterpolo
Member of the World Team 2017 by total-waterpolo
Croatian Water Polo Player of the Year: 2014 with Primorje Rijeka
Croatian Water Polo Player of the Year: 2015 with Primorje Rijeka
Croatian Water Polo Player of the Year: 2017 with Pro Recco
Adriatic League MVP 2012–13 with Primorje Rijeka
Adriatic League MVP 2014–15 with Primorje Rijeka
Adriatic League Top Scorer: 2010–11 with Primorje Rijeka
Adriatic League Top Scorer: 2014–15 with Primorje Rijeka
LEN Champions League Top Scorer: 2014–15 with Primorje Rijeka 
World Cup Top Scorer: 2010 Oradea
World League Top Scorer: 2011 Firenze
European Championship Top Scorer: 2012 Eindhoven
World Championship Top Scorer: 2013 Barcelona
Olympic Games 2016 Team of the Tournament
2013 World Championship Team of the Tournament
2017 World Championship Team of the Tournament

Orders
 Order of Danica Hrvatska with face of Franjo Bučar - 2016

See also
 Croatia men's Olympic water polo team records and statistics
 List of Olympic champions in men's water polo
 List of Olympic medalists in water polo (men)
 List of men's Olympic water polo tournament top goalscorers
 List of world champions in men's water polo
 List of World Aquatics Championships medalists in water polo

References

External links
 

1990 births
Living people
Sportspeople from Dubrovnik
Croatian male water polo players
Water polo drivers
Water polo players at the 2012 Summer Olympics
Water polo players at the 2016 Summer Olympics
Medalists at the 2012 Summer Olympics
Medalists at the 2016 Summer Olympics
Olympic gold medalists for Croatia in water polo
Olympic silver medalists for Croatia in water polo
World Aquatics Championships medalists in water polo
Competitors at the 2013 Mediterranean Games
Mediterranean Games medalists in water polo
Mediterranean Games gold medalists for Croatia
Croatian water polo coaches
Croatian expatriate sportspeople in Italy
Expatriate water polo players